The 2020–21 Slovenian Football Cup was the 30th edition of the football knockout competition in Slovenia. The tournament began on 2 September 2020 and ended on 25 May 2021 with the final. The winners of the competition, Olimpija Ljubljana, earned a place in the second qualifying round of the 2021–22 UEFA Europa Conference League.

Mura were the defending champions after winning the previous season's final.

Qualified teams

2019–20 Slovenian PrvaLiga members
Aluminij
Bravo
Celje
Domžale
Maribor
Mura
Olimpija
Rudar Velenje
Tabor Sežana
Triglav Kranj

Qualified through MNZ Regional Cups
2019–20 MNZ Koper Cup: Koper and Jadran Dekani
2019–20 MNZG-Kranj Cup: Bohinj and Šenčur
2019–20 MNZ Lendava Cup: Odranci and Nafta 1903
2019–20 MNZ Ljubljana Cup: Radomlje and Ilirija 1911
2019–20 MNZ Maribor Cup: Dravograd and Fužinar
2019–20 MNZ Murska Sobota Cup: Čarda and Beltinci
2019–20 MNZ Nova Gorica Cup: Adria and Brda
2019–20 MNZ Ptuj Cup: Drava Ptuj and Bistrica

Determined by draw
MNZ Celje: Mons Claudius and Brežice 1919

First round
Twelve first round matches were played from 2 to 23 September 2020.

Round of 16
The round of 16 ties were played between 20 October 2020 and 18 March 2021.

Quarter-finals
The quarter–finals were played on 27–28 April 2021.

Semi-finals
The semi–finals were played on 12–13 May 2021.

Final
The final was played on 25 May 2021.

See also
 2020–21 Slovenian PrvaLiga

References

External links
 UEFA

Slovenian Football Cup seasons
Cup
Slovenia